Sunnybrae may refer to:

Australia:
Sunnybrae Farm Complex, a heritage site on the former Islington Sewage Farm in Regency Park, South Australia
Sunnybrae, a town in Peterborough District, South Australia

Canada:
Sunnybrae, Nova Scotia, a community in Pictou County
Sunnybrae Provincial Park, a protected area in British Columbia
Sunnybrae, a community within the municipality of Trent Hills, Ontario
Sunnybrae Public School, a school in Simcoe County, Ontario

New Zealand:
Sunnybrae Normal School in Hillcrest, Auckland

See also
Sunny Brae (disambiguation)